The Stormy Night is a 2015 Chinese horror thriller film directed by Liu Tianrong. It was released on November 6, 2015.

Cast
Lan Yan
Daniella Wang
Dong Yufeng

Reception
The film has earned  at the Chinese box office.

References

2015 horror thriller films
2015 horror films
Chinese horror thriller films